The Military Police of Goiás State are the preventive police force of the state of Goiás. In Brazil, Military Police are reserve and ancillary forces of the Brazilian Army, and part of the System of Public Security and Brazilian Social Protection. Its members are called "State Military" person.

Organization 
The Military Police of Goiás State is formed by battalions, companies, and platoons.
The battalions and independent companies are organized into Regional Commands. These Commands are in major urban centers, and their battalions and companies are distributed according to population density in cities.

Regional commands of Military Police 
1st CRPM - Goiânia
1st Battalion - Goiânia;
7th Battalion - Goiânia;
9th Battalion - Goiânia;
13th Battalion - Goiânia;
1st Independent Company - Goiânia;
6th Independent Company - Goiânia;
9th Independent Company - Goiânia;
15th Independent Company - Goiânia;
28th Independent Company - Goiânia;
29th Independent Company - Goiânia.

2nd CRPM - Aparecida de Goiânia
8th BPM - Aparecida de Goiânia;
22nd BPM - Trindade;
8th CIPM - Aparecida de Goiânia;
16th CIPM - Aparecida de Goiânia;
17th CIPM - Senador Canedo;
25th CIPM - Aparecida de Goiânia;
26th CIPM - Aparecida de Goiânia.

3rd CRPM - Anápolis
4th BPM - Anápolis;
18th CIPM - Pirenópolis;
23rd CIPM - Inhumas;
24th CIPM - Anápolis.

4th CRPM - Goiás
6th BPM - Goiás;
19th CIPM - Jussara.

5th CRPM - Luziânia
10th - BPM - Luziânia;
17th BPM - Águas Lindas de Goiás;
19th BPM - Novo Gama;
20th BPM - Valparaíso de Goiás;
2nd CIPM - Luziânia;
3rd CIPM - Cidade Ocidental;
11th CIPM - Santo Antônio do Descoberto;
25th CIPM - Aguas Lindas de Goiás;
32nd CIPM - Cristalina;
36th CIPM - Padre Bernardo.

6th CRPM - Itumbiara
5th BPM - Itumbiara;
10th CIPM - Morrinhos;
14th CIPM - Caldas Novas;
20th CIPM - Goiatuba.

7th CRPM - Iporá
12th BPM - Iporá;
25th BPM - Palmeiras de Goias;
4th CIPM - Aragarças.

8th CRPM - Rio Verde
2nd - BPM - Rio Verde;
5th CIPM - Indiara;
12th CIPM - Quirinópolis.

9th CRPM - Catalão
18th BPM - Catalão;
11th BPM - Pires do Rio.

10th CRPM - Ceres
14th BPM - Uruaçu;
23rd BPM - Goianésia;
22nd CIPM - Ceres.

11th CRPM - Formosa
16th BPM - Formosa;
21st BPM - Planaltina de Goiás.

12th CRPM - Porangatu
3rd BPM - Porangatu;
13th CIPM - São Miguel do Araguaia.

13th CRPM - Posse
24th BPM - Posse.

14th CRPM - Jataí
15th BPM - Jataí;
7th CIPM - Mineiros.

Special Units
 Regiment of Mounted Police;
 Battalion of Riot Control;
 Battalion of Highway Patrol;
 Battalion of Environmental Police;
 Battalion of Control of Urban Traffic.

References

See also 
 Goiás State
 Military Police of Brazil
 Military Firefighters Corps (Brazil)
Brazilian Federal Police
Federal Highway Police
Brazilian Civil Police
 Brazilian Armed Forces
 Military Police
 Gendarmerie

Goias
Government of Goiás